People v. Marsden  is a 1970 California Supreme Court decision that held it was error for the trial court to deny a defendant's motion to relieve his court-appointed counsel without holding a hearing to allow the defendant to explain his grounds. The trial court had denied the motion based on the trial judge's own observations of the proceedings and belief that the attorney was providing effective representation. Criminal defendants in the United States have the right to appointed counsel if they cannot afford to hire an attorney under the Sixth Amendment as interpreted by the United States Supreme Court case Gideon v. Wainwright.

As a result of the court's decision in Marsden, criminal defendants in California courts can ask for Marsden hearings, where they are given an opportunity to ask for new court-appointed counsel. Such hearings are held in closed court; the district attorney and all spectators are asked to leave the courtroom. It is rare for such hearings to result in the replacement of court-appointed counsel; defendants do not have an absolute right to an appointed lawyer of their choice.

Notes

References
 People v. Marsden (1970) 465 P.2d 44, 2 Cal.3d 118

California state case law
1970 in United States case law
1970 in California
United States criminal procedure case law